Gabriel Sherman is an American author. In 2014, he wrote a biography about Fox News Channel president Roger Ailes called The Loudest Voice in the Room: How the Brilliant, Bombastic Roger Ailes Built Fox News – and Divided a Country, which debuted at #9 on The New York Times Bestseller list.

Early life and education
Gabriel Sherman is the son of Raechelle Beth Kriger Thedinga and Leonard Sherman. His mother is a dietitian and nutritionist, and his father, a retired partner in Accenture, is an adjunct professor of marketing at Columbia Business School. He has written for The New York Observer and for New York magazine where he was a contributing editor. He is a graduate of Middlebury College in Middlebury, Vermont.

Career
Sherman is a special correspondent for Vanity Fair. He has been a national-affairs editor for New York magazine, and he is a regular contributor to NBC News and MSNBC.

The Loudest Voice in the Room
SF Gate called his biography of Roger Ailes, the founder and longtime chairman and CEO of Fox News, Fox Television Stations and 20th Television, The Loudest Voice in the Room, "classic in a subgenre that might be called Enraged TV Executives Throwing Things." Sherman interviewed 600 people for the book, but did not have an interview with Ailes himself. Sherman portrays Ailes' leadership of Fox News as "absolute". Ken Kurson wrote that the Ze'ev Chafets' biography, Roger Ailes: Off Camera, released before Sherman's book, "does a better job penetrating the psyche of Mr. Ailes (Mr. Chafets had extensive access to the wizard), and Mr. Sherman’s book does a better job depicting the phenomenon of Fox News and its cultural meaning." Fox News has denied many of the events depicted in the book. The book led to a number of media reports about Fox and its culture. Jay Ambrose said that readers "should also not worry yourself to death about" The Loudest Voice in the Room because Ailes is a "fascinating if endlessly castigated man whose direction of Fox News divided nothing."

His book was turned into a miniseries, The Loudest Voice, starring Russell Crowe as Ailes. In the show, Sherman was played by Fran Kranz.

Personal life
In 2011, Sherman married Jennifer Stahl in a Jewish ceremony. Stahl is an editor at ProPublica. Formerly, she was a fact-checker at The New Yorker magazine. She is a graduate of Princeton University and was a Fulbright Scholar in classical and German literature at Freie Universität Berlin in Germany, from 2004 to 2005.

Bibliography

References

External links
 Official website
 

American male non-fiction writers
American Jews
Living people
21st-century American biographers
Year of birth missing (living people)
Holderness School alumni
Vanity Fair (magazine) people